Shariff Muhammed Kabungsuwan (Malay: Muhammad Kebungsuwan, Jawi: شريف کبوڠسووان) was the first Sultan of Maguindanao in the Philippines. A native of Johore in Maritime Southeast Asia, Kabungsuwan re-settled in Mindanao in the Philippines where he preached Islam to the native tribes around the region.

Origin
Maguindanao genealogy records state that Kabungsuwan's father was an Arab and a sharif or a descendant of the Islamic prophet Mohammed while his mother was Malay. His recorded name "Kabungsuwan" in Maguindanao tradition means "youngest" and is said to the be the youngest among three children. His eldest brother, Ahmad is said to have established the Bruneian Sultanate while his other brother Alawi is said to have set up the Sulu Sultanate.

Mission work in Mindanao
Kabungsuwan is generally regarded as the one who introduced Islam in the Lanao and Maguindanao areas in Mindanao arriving in the area in the early 16th century. There are several tarsilas or written genealogy on Kabungsuwan though most of these state that he brought in men when he landed in Mindanao, his group are composed of seafarers, there was initial force with his group's interaction with the locals and that there were already Muslims in Mindanao when his Kangungsuwan and his men landed near the mouth of the Pulangi River. Kabungsuwan formed alliances with influential royal families of Sulu, Borneo, and Ternate. This led to Islam becoming the dominant religion around Lake Lanao by the 19th century.

Personal life
Kabungsuwan traded in T'buk (old name of Malabang) Malabang, Lanao, married to the native princess of Maranao.

Kabungsuwan was of Arab-Malay ethnicity. He married a local princess and established the Sultanate of Maguindanao in the 16th century. The sultanate was usually centered in the valley of Cotabato.

Legacy
The former province of Shariff Kabunsuan in the Philippines was named after him.

Notes

References
 Ang Bayan Sa Labas Ng Maynila, by Rosario Cruz Lucero, published by Ateneo de Manila University Press, 2008, 

1543 deaths
Filipino datus, rajas and sultans
Filipino Muslims
Filipino people of Malay descent
Islam in the Philippines
Muslim missionaries
Muslim monarchs
People from Johor
Year of birth unknown
Filipino people of Malaysian descent